Walk Through Exits Only is the debut solo album by Pantera frontman  Phil Anselmo and his backing band The Illegals. It was released on July 16, 2013 under Anselmo's own label, Housecore Records.  This album has been compared to Pantera's 1996 album The Great Southern Trendkill due to Anselmo's extreme vocals and very heavy guitar riffs.

Track list

Personnel

Philip H. Anselmo & The Illegals
 Phil Anselmo − vocals
 Marzi Montazeri − guitars
 Bennett Bartley − bass guitar
 Joe Gonzalez − drums

References

External links
Walk Through Exits Only at iTunes.com

2013 debut albums
Phil Anselmo albums
Albums produced by Phil Anselmo